Karen Young may refer to:
Karen Young (actress) (born 1958), American film and TV actress
Karen Young (author), American romance novelist of the late 20th / early 21st centuries
Karen Young (American singer) (1951–1991), disco singer, one-hit-wonder of the late 1970s
Karen Young (British singer) (born 1946), released several singles in the late 1960s
Karen Young (Canadian singer) (born 1951), singer and composer
Karen Young (cricketer) (born 1968), Irish cricketer
Karen Lewis Young (born 1951), American politician in the Maryland House of Delegates
Karen Young, one of the pseudonyms of Mary Millington (1945–1979)